"Carried Away" is a song written by Steve Bogard and Jeff Stevens and recorded by American country music artist George Strait. It was released in June 1996 as the second single from Strait's 1996 album Blue Clear Sky. In August of that year, it became Strait's 30th number one hit on the US Billboard Hot Country Singles and Tracks (now Hot Country Songs) chart.  The song was one of two George Strait songs (the other being "One Night at a Time") to be nominated for Single of the Year at the 1997 Country Music Association awards.

Critical reception
Deborah Evans Price, of Billboard magazine reviewed the song favorably, saying that the strongest thing about the single is Strait's "heartfelt delivery." She goes on to say that "the melody is pretty, but the lyric just seems a little clichéd and unworthy of Strait's vocal gifts.

Chart positions
"Carried Away" debuted at number 73 on the U.S. Billboard Hot Country Singles & Tracks for the week of May 18, 1996.

Year-end charts

Certifications

References

1996 singles
1996 songs
Country ballads
George Strait songs
Songs written by Steve Bogard
Songs written by Jeff Stevens (singer)
Song recordings produced by Tony Brown (record producer)
MCA Nashville Records singles